Krásny Brod is a village and municipality in the Medzilaborce District in the Prešov Region of far north-eastern Slovakia.

History
In historical records the village was first mentioned in 1557.

Geography
The municipality lies at an altitude of 301 metres and covers an area of 15.113 km2. It has a population of about 425 people.

Gallery

References

External links
 
 
https://web.archive.org/web/20080111223415/http://www.statistics.sk/mosmis/eng/run.html 

Villages and municipalities in Medzilaborce District